The 2021–22 season was the 73rd season in the existence of UD Las Palmas and the club's fourth consecutive season in the second division of Spanish football. In addition to the domestic league, Las Palmas participated in this season's edition of the Copa del Rey.

Players

First-team squad
.

Reserve team

Out on loan

Transfers

In

Out

Pre-season and friendlies

Competitions

Overall record

Segunda División

League table

Results summary

Results by round

Matches
The league fixtures were announced on 30 June 2021.

Promotion play-offs

Copa del Rey

Statistics

Goalscorers

References

UD Las Palmas seasons
Las Palmas